Myron "Mike" Joseph Stankiewicz (born December 4, 1935) is a retired professional ice hockey player. He played 35 NHL games with the St. Louis Blues and Philadelphia Flyers. Despite his brief NHL career, Stankiewicz was a top goal scorer in the AHL, breaking the 20-goal mark six times in seven seasons with Hershey. He is the brother of Ed Stankiewicz, a pro hockey left winger who played 6 games in the NHL.

References

External links
 

1935 births
Living people
Barrie Flyers players
Canadian ice hockey left wingers
Edmonton Flyers (WHL) players
Hershey Bears players
Ice hockey people from Ontario
Kitchener Greenshirts players
Omaha Knights (CHL) players
Philadelphia Flyers players
Quebec Aces (AHL) players
Quebec Aces (QSHL) players
Sportspeople from Kitchener, Ontario
St. Louis Blues players